Stephanie Patricia Johnson  (born 1961) is a poet, playwright, and short story writer from New Zealand. She lives in Auckland with her husband, film editor Tim Woodhouse, although she lived in Australia for much of her twenties.  Many of her books have been published there, and her non-fiction book West Island, about New Zealanders in Australia, is partly autobiographical.

Background 

Johnson was born in Auckland, New Zealand in 1961.

Career 
Johnson has taught creative writing at the University of Auckland, the University of Waikato, Auckland University of Technology and Massey University. She co-founded the Auckland Writers' Festival with Peter Wells, and served as creative director and trustee.

Published works 
Johnson has published novels, poetry, plays, and collections of short stories.

Novels and short stories 
 The Glass Whittler (1989, New Women's Press), short stories
 Crimes of Neglect (1992, New Women's Press), novel
 All the Tenderness Left in the World (1993, Otago University Press), short stories
 The Heart’s Wild Surf (1996, Random House), novel
 The Whistler (1998, Vintage, Random House), novel
 Belief (2000, Vintage, Random House), novel
 The Shag Incident (2002, Vintage, Random House), novel
 Music From A Distant Room (2004, Vintage, Random House)
 Drowned Sprat and Other Stories (2005, Vintage, Random House), short stories
 John Tomb's Head (2006, Vintage, Random House), novel
 Swimmers' Rope (2008, Vintage, Random House) novel
 The Open World (2012, Vintage, Random House), novel
 The Writing Class (2013, Vintage, Random House), novel
 The Writers’ Festival (2015, Vintage, Random House), novel
 Playing for Both Sides (2016, Bridget Williams Books), creative non-fiction 
 West Island: Five Twentieth-century New Zealanders in Australia (2019, Otago University Press), creative non-fiction
 Everything Changes (2021, Penguin Random House), novel

Plays and radio dramas 
 Accidental Phantasies (1985), stage play
 Castle In the Harbour (1987), radio drama
 Folie à Deux (1995, with Stuart Hoar), stage play
 Hard Hitting Documentary (1995), radio drama
 Sparrow’s Pearls (1996), radio drama
 Trout (1996), radio drama

Poetry 
 The Bleeding Ballerina (1987, Hard Echo Press), poetry
 Moody Bitch (2003, Godwit), poetry

Honours and awards 

In 1985, Johnson won the Bruce Mason Playwriting Award.

In the Montana New Zealand Book Awards, The Whistler, was shortlisted for the fiction award in 1999 and Belief was shortlisted in 2001.

The Shag Incident was awarded the Deutz Medal for Fiction at the 2003 Montana New Zealand Book Awards.

Johnson also won the 1996 Dymocks/Quote Unquote Reader's Poll, Best New Zealand Book for The Heart’s Wild Surf and Crimes of Neglect, was shortlisted for the 1993 Wattie Book Awards.

Music From a Distant Room (in 2006) and John Tomb's Head (in 2008) were nominated for International Dublin Literary Award.

In the 2019 Queen's Birthday Honours, Johnson was appointed a Member of the New Zealand Order of Merit, for services to literature.

In 2022 she received the Prime Minister's Award for Literary Achievement in Fiction.

Fellowships and residencies 
Johnson received the 2000 New Zealand Post Katherine Mansfield Prize, allowing her to travel to Menton, France. She received the University of Auckland Literary Fellowship in 2001. In 2016 she was selected as the Randell Cottage Writer in Residence.

References 

Living people
1961 births
New Zealand fiction writers
New Zealand women novelists
New Zealand women short story writers
Writers from Auckland
Academic staff of the University of Waikato
Academic staff of the University of Auckland
Members of the New Zealand Order of Merit